Chamaki (also Romanized as Chamakī) is a village in Tala Tappeh Rural District, Nazlu District, Urmia County, West Azerbaijan Province, Iran. In the 1986 census, 33 people in 7 families were reported to live in Chamaki. At the 2006 census, its existence was noted, but its population was not reported.  The local church is known as Saint Mary. In 2020 the church underwent restoration.
The village was exclusively inhabited by Assyrians until the Assyrian genocide.

References 

Populated places in Urmia County